Conor Powell (born 26 August 1987 in Dublin) is an Irish former footballer who played as a left back.

Club career
Powell began his youth career at his hometown club Portmarnock A.F.C. He outgrew the club, however, and made the switch to Dublin city club Belvedere where he was part of a very talented team, enjoying a lot of success before being brought to Bohemians in 2005. He progressed quickly, making his debut in the League of Ireland Cup at home to St. Patrick's Athletic in June 2005 with his league debut coming less than 2 months later against Shelbourne.

He was voted Bohemians under-21 Player of the Year in 2005 and Bohemians Young Player of the Year in 2006 and 2007. He was also the FAI Schools Player of the Year in 2006.

Conor picked up his first medal in senior football as Bohs marched to the 2008 league title. This achievement was rewarded when he was voted on to the League of Ireland Premier Division Team for 2008, receiving 56% of the votes for the left back position.

Conor scored his first ever senior goal for Bohs during the 2009 campaign on 9 October in Dalymount Park against Drogheda United. At the season's end, Powell picked up his second consecutive league winners medal as Bohemians won their first ever back-to-back titles, beating rivals Shamrock Rovers by 4 points. His fine form during the season was rewarded when he voted the PFAI Young Player of the Year for 2009.

Due to Bohemians' financial trouble Powell parted company with the club at the end of the 2010 season.

On 6 January 2011, it was reported that he was to join the English League One side Colchester United, where he would team up with former Irish teammate Dave Mooney.

However, after only making two league appearances since his January move to Colchester, he was released from the club on 10 May 2011. His only appearances coming in a Good Friday trip to Brentford on 22 April 2011 and against already Champions, Brighton, in a televised game on 25 April 2011.

On 9 July, Sligo Rovers announced the signing of Powell until the end of the season.

On 18 January 2012, it was announced that Powell had signed for Shamrock Rovers for the 2012 season. He was unveiled at the Tallaght Stadium alongside Killian Brennan, Graham Gartland, Daryl Kavanagh and player-coach Colin Hawkins. In November 2012 Powell signed on for another season.

At the beginning of 2014, Powell signed for Norwegian side Vard Haugesund where he spent one season.

On 2 February 2015, it was announced that Powell had signed for League of Ireland side Longford Town. Following Longford's relegation from the Premier Division at the end of the 2016 season, Powell left the club.

International career
At international level he has represented his country at schoolboy, under-19 and under-21 levels. He made his Ireland under-21 debut away to Luxembourg in October 2006.

Honours

Club
Bohemians
 League of Ireland (2): 2008, 2009
 FAI Cup (1): 2008
 Setanta Sports Cup (1): 2009–10
 League of Ireland Cup (1): 2009

Sligo Rovers
 FAI Cup (1): 2011 FAI Cup

Shamrock Rovers
 Leinster Senior Cup (2): 2012, 2013

Individual
 PFAI Young Player of the Year: 2009
 FAI Schools Player of the Year: 2006

References

External links

Association footballers from County Dublin
1987 births
Republic of Ireland association footballers
League of Ireland players
Bohemian F.C. players
Colchester United F.C. players
English Football League players
Sligo Rovers F.C. players
Shamrock Rovers F.C. players
Longford Town F.C. players
Republic of Ireland youth international footballers
Republic of Ireland under-21 international footballers
Association football fullbacks
Living people
League of Ireland XI players
Republic of Ireland under-23 international footballers
Belvedere F.C. players